Ortharbela jurateae is a moth in the family Cossidae. It is found in Tanzania, where it has been recorded from the Uluguru Mountains. The habitat consists of lowland and submontane miombo woodlands.

The length of the forewings is about 8.5 mm. The forewings are buffy olive with a patch of isabella colour at the base of the wing and smaller ones along the costal margin. The hindwings are buffy olive.

Etymology 
The species is named for Dr Jurate De Prins.

References 

Natural History Museum Lepidoptera generic names catalog

Endemic fauna of Tanzania
Metarbelinae
Moths described in 2009